Martiros is a village in the Vayk Municipality of the Vayots Dzor Province of Armenia. There is a newer and an older section to the village.

History
A huge khachkar in the older section of the village attests that the settlement was founded in 1283 at the command of Prince Prosh and his son Paron Hasan.

Gallery

References

External links 

 
 
 

Populated places in Vayots Dzor Province